Aleksandr Mikhailovich Rayevskiy (30 August 1957, Pastavy, Vitsebsk Voblast, Belarus - 30 August 2008) was a test pilot for the Russian military. While flying inside Russia and in Belarus, he has achieved 2300 hours of flight time, piloting various aircraft as the Su-27 and the Mig-29, and has over 200 accident-free landings on top of aircraft carriers. Due to his work as a test pilot and of his record, he was awarded the title of Hero of the Russian Federation.

He died in a car accident.

See also 
Timur Apakidze

References 
Russian Gazette article

1957 births
2008 deaths
People from Pastavy
Heroes of the Russian Federation
Russian test pilots
Burials in Troyekurovskoye Cemetery